This is a list of notable events in music that took place in the year 1949.

Specific locations
1949 in British music
1949 in Norwegian music

Specific genres
1949 in country music
1949 in jazz

Events
January 12 – Maro Ajemian, to whom the work is dedicated, gives one of the first performances of the complete cycle of John Cage's Sonatas and Interludes at Carnegie Hall.
February 4 – Ljuba Welitsch makes her Metropolitan Opera début in Salome.
February 11 – London Mozart Players makes debut concert at Wigmore Hall
April – Goree Carter records "Rock Awhile", which is considered to be the first rock and roll record.
June 25 – The Philharmonic Piano Quartet make their New York City debut at Lewisohn Stadium
September 5 – English Wagnerian tenor Walter Widdop appears at The Proms, singing "Lohengrin's Farewell", the day before his sudden death at the age of 51.
December 15 – Birdland jazz club opens in New York City.
December 24 – At the start of the Holy Year, Charles Gounod's Inno e Marcia Pontificale is adopted as the new papal anthem.
December 29 – Les Paul and Mary Ford marry.
The Boccherini Quintet is formed in Rome.
Ravi Shankar becomes music director of All India Radio.
Mitch Miller begins his career as one of the 20th century's most successful record producers at Mercury
Eddie Fisher is "discovered" by Eddie Cantor and signs with RCA.
Bob Hope suggests that Anthony Benedetto change his stage name from "Joe Bari" to "Tony Bennett"
Frankie Laine records "Mule Train", considered by some critics as marking the beginning of the rock era.
Teresa Brewer makes her first recording on the London label.
The Ames Brothers become the first artists to record for Coral Records, a subsidiary of Decca.
Johnnie Ray performs at the Flame Showbar in Detroit.
The legendary Al Jolson records the soundtrack to "Jolson Sings Again," the sequel to his hugely successful biopic "The Jolson Story" (1946)
45 rpm discs are introduced
Gorni Kramer starts working for musical impresarios Garinei and Giovannini.
Country singer Bill Haley enters into a partnership with musicians Johnny Grande and Billy Williamson to form Bill Haley and His Saddlemen; in 1952 the group is renamed Bill Haley & His Comets.
The International Rostrum of Composers is founded.

Albums released
 Der Bingle – Bing Crosby
 Jerome Kern Songs – Bing Crosby
 Merry Christmas – Bing Crosby
 Stephen Foster Songs – Bing Crosby
 Lights, Cameras, Action – Doris Day
 You're My Thrill – Doris Day
 Frankie Laine – Frankie Laine
 Frankie Laine Favorites – Frankie Laine
 Songs from the Heart – Frankie Laine
 The Return of the Wayfaring Stranger – Burl Ives
 Dinah Shore – Dinah Shore
 Jo Stafford with Gordon MacRae – Jo Stafford & Gordon MacRae

US No. 1 hit singles
These singles reached the top of the US charts in 1949.

Top popular records

Before the Hot100 was implemented in 1958, Billboard magazine measured a record's performance with three charts, 'Best-Selling Popular Retail Records', 'Records Most Played By Disk Jockeys' and 'Most-Played Juke Box Records'. We use the same data, with several modifications. Having no commercial deadlines, year-end data does not end December 31, chart-runs are ever truncated, and every hit song has a year to call home. With few exceptions, records included entered the charts between November 1948 and December 1949. Each week fifteen points were awarded to the number one record, then nine points for number two, eight points for number three, and so on. This system rewards songs that reach the highest positions, as well as those that had the longest chart runs. Each record's three point totals are combined, with that number determining the year-end rank. Number of weeks at number one or total weeks on the chart do not include duplicates; if a record was #1 on all 3 charts on July 15, that counts as one week, not three. Additional information from other sources is reported, but not used for ranking. This includes dates from the "Discography of American Historical Recordings" website, cross-over information from R&B and Country charts, 'Cashbox', and other sources as noted.

Top R&B and country hit records
Don't Rob Another Man's Castle performed by Eddy Arnold; words and music by Jenny Lou Carson
The Fat Man, by Fats Domino, first record with back beat all the way through
My Bucket's Got a Hole in It by Hank Williams and later by T. Texas Tyler
"When Things Go Wrong With You (It Hurts Me Too)" by Tampa Red, later covered by Elmore James among others

Published popular music
 "Again", words: Dorcas Cochran, music: Lionel Newman
 "Bali Ha'i" w. Oscar Hammerstein II m. Richard Rodgers introduced by Juanita Hall in the musical South Pacific
 "Bamboo" w. Buddy Bernier m. Nat Simon
 "Beyond the Reef" w.m. Jack Pitman
 "Blame My Absent-Minded Heart" w. Sammy Cahn m. Jule Styne
 "Bloody Mary" w. Oscar Hammerstein II m. Richard Rodgers from the musical South Pacific
 "Blue Ribbon Gal" Irwin Dash & Ross Parker
 "Bluebird on Your Windowsill" w.m. Elizabeth Clarke & Robert Mellin
 "Bonaparte's Retreat" w.m. Pee Wee King
 "Bye Bye Baby" w. Leo Robin m. Jule Styne introduced by Carol Channing and Jack McCauley in the musical Gentlemen Prefer Blondes. Performed in the film version by Marilyn Monroe.
 "Cafe Mozart Waltz" m. Anton Karas played by Karas on the soundtrack of the film The Third Man.
 "Clopin Clopant" Bruno Coquatrix, Pierre Dudan & Kermit Goell
 "A Cock-Eyed Optimist" w. Oscar Hammerstein II m. Richard Rodgers introduced by Mary Martin in the musical South Pacific. Mitzi Gaynor sang it in the film version.
 "Count Every Star" w. Sammy Gallop m. Bruno Coquatrix
 "Crazy, He Calls Me" w. Bob Russell m. Carl Sigman
 "Daddy's Little Girl" w.m. Bobby Burke & Horace Gerlach
 "Dear Hearts and Gentle People" w. Bob Hilliard m. Sammy Fain
 "Diamonds Are A Girl's Best Friend" w. Leo Robin m. Jule Styne. Introduced by Carol Channing in the musical Gentlemen Prefer Blondes. Marilyn Monroe performed the number in the film version.
 "Did You See Jackie Robinson Hit That Ball?" w.m. Buddy Johnson
 "Dirty Old Town" w.m. Ewan MacColl
 "Dites-Moi" w. Oscar Hammerstein II m. Richard Rodgers introduced by Michael de Leon and Barbara Luna in the musical South Pacific
 "Don't Cry, Joe (Let Her Go, Let Her Go, Let Her Go)" w.m. Joe Marsala
 "A Dream Is A Wish Your Heart Makes" w.m. Mack David, Al Hoffman & Jerry Livingston. Ilene Woods provided the vocal for the animated film Cinderella.
 "Dreamer With A Penny" w.m. Allan Roberts & Lester Lee
 "A Dreamer's Holiday" w. Kim Gannon m. Mabel Wayne
 "Enjoy Yourself (It's Later than You Think)" w. Herb Magidson m. Carl Sigman
 "The Fat Man" w. Antoine Domino m. Dave Bartholomew
 "The Four Winds And The Seven Seas" w. Hal David m. Don Rodney
 "Happy Talk" w. Oscar Hammerstein II m. Richard Rodgers introduced by Juanita Hall in the musical South Pacific.
 "He's a Real Gone Guy" w.m. Nellie Lutcher
 "Homework" w.m. Irving Berlin
 "Honey Bun" w. Oscar Hammerstein II m. Richard Rodgers. Introduced by Mary Martin in the musical South Pacific. Performed in the 1958 film version by Mitzi Gaynor.
 "Hop-Scotch Polka" w.m. William "Billy" Whitlock, Carl Sigman & Gene Rayburn
 "The Horse Told Me" w. Johnny Burke m. Jimmy Van Heusen introduced by Bing Crosby in the film Riding High.
 "The Hot Canary" m. Paul Nero
 "How Can You Buy Killarney?" Hamilton Kennedy, Ted Steels, Freddie Grant (Grundland) & Gerard Morrison
 "How It Lies, How It Lies, How It Lies!" w. Paul Francis Webster m. Sonny Burke
 "The Hucklebuck" w. Roy Alfred m. Andy Gibson
 "Hymne à l'amour" w. Édith Piaf m. Marguerite Monnot
 "I Didn't Know the Gun Was Loaded" w.m. Hank Fort & Herb Leighton
 "I Don't See Me in Your Eyes Anymore" w.m. Bennie Benjamin & George David Weiss
 "I Love You Because" w.m. Leon Payne
 "I Said My Pajamas" w.m. Edward Pola & George Wyle
 "I Yust Go Nuts At Christmas" w.m. Harry Stewart
 "I'll Never Slip Around Again" Floyd Tillman
 "I'm Gonna Wash That Man Right Outa My Hair" w. Oscar Hammerstein II m. Richard Rodgers introduced by Mary Martin in the musical South Pacific.
 "I'm So Lonesome I Could Cry" w.m. Hank Williams
 "It's a Great Feeling" w. Sammy Cahn m. Jule Styne introduced by Doris Day in the film It's a Great Feeling
 "It's So Nice to Have a Man Around The House" w. John Elliot m. Harold Spina
 "Just One Way to Say I Love You" w.m. Irving Berlin introduced by Eddie Albert and Allyn Ann McLerie in the musical Miss Liberty.
 "Let's Take An Old Fashioned Walk" w.m. Irving Berlin introduced by Eddie Albert and Allyn Ann McLerie in the musical Miss Liberty
 "A Little Girl from Little Rock" w. Leo Robin m. Jule Styne introduced by Carol Channing in the musical Gentlemen Prefer Blondes. Jane Russell and Marilyn Monroe were just two little girls in the film version.
 "Lush Life" w.m. Billy Strayhorn
 "Maybe It's Because" w. Harry Ruby m. Johnnie Scott
 "Melodie d'Amour" w.(Eng) Leo Johns m. Henri Salvador
 "Mona Lisa" w.m. Ray Evans & Jay Livingston
 "Mule Train" w.m. Johnny Lange, Hy Heath & Fred Glickman
 "Music! Music! Music!" w.m. Stephen Weiss & Bernie Baum
 "My Bolero" Kennedy, Simon
 "My Foolish Heart" w. Ned Washington m. Victor Young introduced by Susan Hayward in the film My Foolish Heart
 "My One and Only Highland Fling" w. Ira Gershwin m. Harry Warren introduced by Fred Astaire and Ginger Rogers in the film The Barkleys of Broadway.
 "Now That I Need You" w.m. Frank Loesser introduced by Betty Hutton in the film Red, Hot and Blue.
 "The Old Master Painter" w. Haven Gillespie m. Beasley Smith
 "Paris Wakes up and Smiles" w.m. Irving Berlin introduced by Johnny V. R. Thompson and Allyn Ann McLerie in the musical Miss Liberty
 "Peter Cottontail" w.m. Jack Rollins & Steve Nelson
 "Pigalle" w.m. Georges Konyn, Charles Newman & Georges Ulmer
 "Portrait of Jennie" w. Gordon Burge m. J. Russell Robinson
 "Put Your Shoes on, Lucy" w.m. Hank Fort
 "Quicksilver" w.m. Irving Taylor, George Wyle & Edward Pola
 "Rag Mop" w.m. Johnnie Lee Wills & Deacon Anderson
 "(Ghost) Riders in the Sky: A Cowboy Legend" w.m. Stan Jones
 "The Right Girl for Me" w. Betty Comden & Adolph Green m. Roger Edens introduced by Frank Sinatra in the film Take Me Out to the Ball Game
 "The River Seine" w. (Eng) Allan Roberts & Alan Holt m. Guy La Forge
 "Room Full Of Roses" w.m. Tim Spencer
 "Rudolph, The Red Nosed Reindeer" w.m. Johnny Marks
 "Saturday Night Fish Fry" w.m. Louis Jordan, Ellis Walsh & Al Carters
 "Scarlet Ribbons" w. Jack Segal m. Evelyn Danzig
 "La Seine" w. Geoffrey Parsons m. Berkeley Fase
 "Sentimental Me" w.m. James T. Morehead & James Cassin
 "Sing Soft, Sing Sweet, Sing Gentle" w.m. Jimmy Durante & Jack Barnett
 "Slippin' Around" w.m. Floyd Tillman
 "Some Day My Heart Will Awake" w. Christopher Hassall m. Ivor Novello. Introduced by Vanessa Lee in the musical King's Rhapsody.
 "Some Enchanted Evening" w. Oscar Hammerstein II m. Richard Rodgers introduced by Ezio Pinza in the musical South Pacific. Giorgio Tozzi dubbed for Rossano Brazzi in the film.
 "A Strawberry Moon (In A Blueberry Sky)" Bob Hilliard & Sammy Mysels
 "Sunshine Cake" w. Johnny Burke m. Jimmy Van Heusen
 "Swamp Girl" w.m. Michael Brown
 "That Lucky Old Sun" w. Haven Gillespie m. Beasley Smith
 "There Is Nothin' Like a Dame" w. Oscar Hammerstein II m. Richard Rodgers from the musical South Pacific.
 "Third Man Theme" m. Anton Karas played by Karas on the soundtrack of the film The Third Man. Also known as "The Harry Lime Theme".
 "This Nearly Was Mine" w. Oscar Hammerstein II m. Richard Rodgers introduced by Ezio Pinza in the musical South Pacific. Giorgio Tozzi dubbed for Rossano Brazzi in the film.
 "Through a Long and Sleepless Night" w. Mack Gordon m. Alfred Newman
 "Too-Whit! Too-Whoo!" Billy Reid
 "Twenty-Four Hours of Sunshine" w. Carl Sigman m. Peter De Rose
 "Up Above My Head" w.m. Sister Rosetta Tharpe
 "The Wedding Of Lili Marlene" w.m. Tommie Connor & Johnny Reine
 "When the Wind Was Green" w.m. Don Hunt
 "A Wonderful Guy" w. Oscar Hammerstein II m. Richard Rodgers introduced by Mary Martin in the musical South Pacific
 "Yingle Bells" adapt. Harry Stewart
 "You Can Have Him" w.m. Irving Berlin from the musical Miss Liberty
 "Younger Than Springtime" w. Oscar Hammerstein II m. Richard Rodgers introduced by William Tabbert in the musical South Pacific
 "You've Got to Be Carefully Taught" w. Oscar Hammerstein II m. Richard Rodgers introduced by William Tabbert in the musical South Pacific

Classical music

Premieres

Compositions
Malcolm Arnold – Symphony No. 1
Aaron Avshalomov – Second Symphony
Henk Badings – Symphony No. 5
Samuel Barber – Piano Sonata, Op. 26
Marcel Bitsch – Six Esquisses symphoniques
Pierre Boulez – Piano Sonata No. 1 
Havergal Brian – Symphony No. 8 in B-flat Minor
Benjamin Britten – Spring Symphony
Jani Christou– Phoenix Music, for orchestra
George Crumb – Sonata for violin and piano
Ferenc Farkas – Finnish Popular Dances
André Jolivet – Flute Concerto
Hans Werner Henze – Symphony No. 2
Paul Hindemith
Sonata for Double Bass and Piano
Sinfonietta in E major
Vagn Holmboe
String Quartet No. 2
Cantata No. 7
Dmitry Kabalevsky – Cello Concerto No. 1 in G Minor, Op. 49 (1948–9)
Wojciech Kilar – Suite for piano
Ernst Krenek – Symphony No. 5
Rued Langgaard – Symphony No. 15 Søstormen, BVN 375
Olivier Messiaen – "Neumes rythmiques" and "Mode de valeurs et d'intensités", for piano (later incorporated as two of the Quatre études de rythme)
Bruno Maderna – Composition No. 1
Nikolai Myaskovsky
Cello Sonata No. 2 in A Minor, Op. 81 (1948–9)
Piano Sonatas 7–9, Opp. 82–4
Symphony No. 27 in C Minor, Op. 85
String Quartet No. 13 in A Minor, Op. 86
Allan Pettersson – Violin Concerto No. 1
Sergei Prokofiev – Sonata for Cello and Piano, Op. 119
Othmar Schoeck – Vision, Op. 63 for Men's Chorus and Orchestra
Arnold Schoenberg
5 Pieces for Orchestra, Op. 16 (second version)
Fantasy for Violin and Piano, Op. 47
Dmitri Shostakovich
Song of the Forests (oratorio)
String Quartet No. 4 in D major, Op. 83
Kaikhosru Shapurji Sorabji – Sequentia cyclica super "Dies irae" ex Missa pro defunctis
Galina Ustvolskaya
Piano Sonata No. 2
Trio for clarinet, violin and piano
Fartein Valen – Symphony No.4, Op. 43
Edgard Varèse – Dance for Burgess
Heitor Villa-Lobos
Guia prático, for piano
Homenagem a Chopin, for piano
William Walton – Violin Sonata
Mieczysław Weinberg – Rhapsody on Moldavian Themes, Op. 47 No. 1
Stefan Wolpe – Sonata for Violin and Piano

Opera

:Category:1949 operas

Film
Aaron Copland – The Heiress
Aaron Copland – The Red Pony
Aram Khachaturian – The Battle of Stalingrad

Jazz

Musical theatre
 Belinda Fair London production opened at the Strand Theatre on June 30 and ran for 131 performances. Starring Adele Dixon
 Brigadoon London production opened at His Majesty's Theatre on April 14 and ran for 685 performances
 Gentlemen Prefer Blondes Broadway production opened at the Ziegfeld Theatre on December 8 and ran for 740 performances
 Her Excellency London production opened at the London Hippodrome on 22 June and ran for 252 performances. Starring Cicely Courtneidge
 King's Rhapsody London production opened at the Palace Theatre on September 15 and ran for 838 performances
 Lost in the Stars (Maxwell Anderson and Kurt Weill) – Broadway production opened at the Music Box Theatre on October 30 and ran for 273 performances
 Miss Liberty Broadway production opened at the Imperial Theatre on July 15 and ran for 308 performances. Starring Eddie Albert, Allyn Ann McLerie and Mary McCarty
 South Pacific (Richard Rodgers and Oscar Hammerstein II) – Broadway production opened at the Majestic Theatre on April 7 and ran for 1925 performances

Musical films
 The Adventures of Ichabod and Mr. Toad animated film
 The Barkleys of Broadway starring Fred Astaire and Ginger Rogers
 A Connecticut Yankee in King Arthur's Court starring Bing Crosby, Rhonda Fleming, Cedric Hardwicke and William Bendix
 Dancing in the Dark
 Holiday in Havana starring Desi Arnaz and Mary Hatcher.
 In the Good Old Summertime starring Judy Garland, Van Johnson, S. Z. Sakall and Buster Keaton.
 The Inspector General starring Danny Kaye
 It's a Wonderful Day
 Look for the Silver Lining starring June Haver, Ray Bolger and Gordon MacRae
 Make Believe Ballroom starring Jerome Courtland and Ruth Warrick and featuring the King Cole Trio and Frankie Carle & His Orchestra. Directed by Joseph Santley.
 Make Mine Laughs starring Ray Bolger, Anne Shirley, Dennis Day, Joan Davis, Jack Haley, Leon Errol, Frances Langford and Frankie Carle & his Orchestra. Directed by Richard Fleischer.
 Maytime in Mayfair starring Anna Neagle and Michael Wilding.
 My Dream Is Yours starring Jack Carson and Doris Day and featuring Bugs Bunny. Directed by Michael Curtiz.
 Neptune's Daughter starring Esther Williams, Red Skelton, Ricardo Montalbán and Betty Garrett. Directed by Eddie Buzzell.
 Oh, You Beautiful Doll starring June Haver, Mark Stevens and S. Z. Sakall.
 An Old-Fashioned Girl starring Gloria Jean and Jimmy Lydon. Directed by Arthur Dreifuss.
 On the Town starring Gene Kelly, Frank Sinatra, Betty Garrett, Ann Miller, Jules Munshin and Vera-Ellen.
 Red, Hot and Blue starring Betty Hutton, Victor Mature, William Demarest, June Havoc and Frank Loesser.
 Slightly French starring Dorothy Lamour and Don Ameche.
 Take Me Out to the Ball Game starring Frank Sinatra, Gene Kelly, Betty Garrett, Esther Williams and Jules Munshin.
 That Midnight Kiss starring Kathryn Grayson, José Iturbi, Ethel Barrymore, Mario Lanza and Jules Munshin.
 Top o' the Morning starring Bing Crosby, Ann Blyth, Barry Fitzgerald and Hume Cronyn. Directed by David Miller.

Births
January 2 – Chick Churchill, blues rock keyboardist (Ten Years After and the Jaybirds)
January 11 – Denny Greene, doo-wop singer and choreographer (Sha Na Na)
January 12 – Andrzej Zaucha, singer
January 15 – George Brown (Kool & the Gang)
January 17 – Mick Taylor, rock guitarist (John Mayall's Bluesbreakers, The Rolling Stones)
January 19 – Robert Palmer, singer (died 2003)
January 22
Joseph Hill, reggae singer (died 2006)
Steve Perry, rock singer-songwriter (Journey)
Mike Westhues, American-Finnish singer-songwriter and guitarist (died 2013)
January 24 – John Belushi, comedian, actor and singer (died 1982)
January 27 – Djavan, Brazilian singer
January 29 – Leroy Sibbles (The Heptones)
February 3 – Arthur Kane, American bass player (New York Dolls) (died 2004)
February 5 – Nigel Olsson, drummer
February 7
Joe English, American drummer (Wings and Sea Level)
Alan Lancaster, English bass player and songwriter (died 2021)
February 12
Stanley Knight (Black Oak Arkansas)
Joaquín Sabina, singer-songwriter and poet
February 21 – Jerry Harrison (Talking Heads)
February 22 – Joseph Hill (Culture) (died 2006)
February 23 – Terry Comer (Ace)
February 25 – Esmeray, singer (died 2002)
March 6 – Mariko Takahashi, pop singer
March 8 – Antonello Venditti, singer-songwriter
March 9 – Kalevi Aho, Finnish composer
March 13
Julia Migenes, operatic soprano
Donald York (Sha Na Na)
March 17 – Daniel Lavoie, singer-songwriter
March 19 – Valery Leontiev, singer
March 20 – Carl Palmer, drummer (Emerson, Lake & Palmer)
March 21
Åge Aleksandersen, singer-songwriter and guitarist
Eddie Money, guitarist, Saxophonist and singer-songwriter
March 24
Nick Lowe, singer-songwriter
Carl Rütti, composer
March 26
Vicki Lawrence, comic performer and pop singer
 Fran Sheehan, rock bassist (Boston)
March 27 – Poul Ruders, composer, songwriter, singer
March 29 – Dave Greenfield, rock keyboard player (The Stranglers)
March 30 – Lene Lovich, singer
April 1 – Gil Scott-Heron, poet, musician and author (died 2011)
April 3 – Richard Thompson, folk musician
April 15 – Alla Pugacheva, Soviet and Russian singer
April 21 – Patti LuPone, singer
April 23 - John Miles, rock music vocalist, guitarist and keyboardist
May 9 – Billy Joel, pianist and singer-songwriter
May 17 – Bill Bruford, drummer (Yes and King Crimson)
May 18
Rick Wakeman, multi-instrumentalist and composer
Bill Wallace, Canadian bass player (The Guess Who and Brother)
May 19 – Dusty Hill, blues rock bass guitarist and singer-songwriter (ZZ Top) (died 2021)
May 26 – Hank Williams Jr., country musician (Monday Night Football theme)
May 29 – Francis Rossi, guitarist and singer (Status Quo)
June 7 – Holly Near, American singer-songwriter, producer and actress
June 11 – Frank Beard, drummer (ZZ Top)
June 13 – Dennis Locorriere, singer-guitarist (Dr. Hook & the Medicine Show)
June 14
Papa Wemba (Jules Shungu Wembadio Pene Kikumba), soukous musician (died 2016)
Alan White, drummer (Plastic Ono Band, Yes) (died 2022) 
June 15
Russell Hitchcock, singer (Air Supply)
Mike Lut, guitarist, singer-songwriter and producer (Brownsville Station)
June 20 – Lionel Richie, singer
June 22
Jaroslav Filip, polymath (died 2000)
Larry Junstrom (Lynyrd Skynyrd, 38 Special) (died 2019)
Alan Osmond (The Osmonds)
June 26
John Illsley (Dire Straits)
Larry Taylor (Canned Heat)
June 30 – Andrew Scott (Sweet)
July 2
Roy Bittan, American keyboard player and songwriter (E Street Band)
Greg Brown, American singer-songwriter and guitarist
July 3
Fontella Bass, singer
John Verity, Argent
July 6
Phyllis Hyman, soul singer (died 1995)
Michael Shrieve, drummer (Santana)
July 10 – Dave Smalley, guitarist (The Raspberries)
July 11 – Liona Boyd, English-Canadian singer-songwriter and guitarist
July 12 – John Wetton, bass guitarist (King Crimson, Roxy Music)
July 15 – Trevor Horn, producer
July 16 – Ray Major, lead guitarist (Mott the Hoople)
July 17 – Geezer Butler, bass guitarist and songwriter (Black Sabbath)
July 18 – Wally Bryson, guitarist (The Raspberries)
July 26 – Roger Taylor, drummer (Queen)
July 27
Maureen McGovern, singer and actress
Henry "H Bomb" Weck, drummer (Brownsville Station)
July 28
Simon Kirke (Free, Bad Company)
Steve Peregrin Took (T. Rex) (died 1980)
August 3 – B. B. Dickerson (War)
August 11 – Eric Carmen, singer-songwriter
August 12 – Mark Knopfler, guitarist and singer (Dire Straits)
August 16 – Bill Spooner (The Tubes)
August 17 – Sib Hashian (Boston)
August 20 – Phil Lynott, singer (Thin Lizzy, Grand Slam (died 1986)
August 23
Rick Springfield, singer-songwriter and actor
Vicky Leandros, Greek singer
August 25
Fariborz Lachini, film score composer
Gene Simmons (Kiss)
August 26 – Bob Cowsill (The Cowsills)
August 27 – Jeff Cook (Alabama) (died 2022)
August 28 – Hugh Cornwell (The Stranglers)
September 1 – Greg Errico (Sly & the Family Stone)
September 5 – Clem Clempson (Humble Pie)
September 9 – John Reid, manager
September 10 – Barriemore Barlow, drummer (Jethro Tull)
September 14
Steve Gaines (Lynyrd Skynyrd) (died 1977)
Fred "Sonic" Smith (MC5)
September 18 – Kerry Livgren (Kansas)
September 20 – Chuck Panozzo and John Panozzo (Styx)
September 23 – Bruce Springsteen, singer-songwriter
September 26 – Wendy Saddington (Gandharvika Dasi), blues, soul and jazz singer (died 2013)
September 27 – Jahn Teigen, singer (died 2020)
September 30 – Eleanor Alberga, Jamaican-British composer
October 1 – André Rieu, violinist, conductor and composer
October 3 – Lindsey Buckingham, guitarist, singer, composer and producer
October 5 – B. W. Stevenson, progressive country musician (died 1988)
October 6 – Thomas McClary (The Commodores)
October 8 – Michael Rosen (Average White Band)
October 13 – Gary Richrath (REO Speedwagon) (died 2015)
October 17 – Bill Hudson, singer (Hudson Brothers)
October 23 – Würzel (Motörhead) (died 2011)
October 27 – Garry Tallent (E Street Band)
November 6 – Arturo Sandoval, jazz performer
November 8 – Bonnie Raitt, blues singer-songwriter
November 12 – Cândida Branca Flor, Portuguese traditional singer and entertainer (died 2001)
November 13 – Terry Reid, singer, guitarist
November 14 – James Young (Styx)
November 23 – Marcia Griffiths, reggae singer
November 28 – Paul Shaffer, bandleader, composer and actor (Late Show with David Letterman)
December 7 – Tom Waits, singer, composer, actor
December 8 – Ray Shulman, progressive rock musician (Gentle Giant)
December 13
Randy Owen, country singer (Alabama)
Tom Verlaine, rock singer (Television) (died 2023)
December 14
Ronnie McNeir, Motown singer (The Four Tops)
Cliff Williams, hard rock bassist and backing singer (Home, AC/DC)
December 16 – Billy Gibbons, rock singer and guitarist (ZZ Top)
December 17 – Paul Rodgers, vocalist (Free, Bad Company, Queen)
December 22 – Robin Gibb (died 2012) and Maurice Gibb (died 2003) (Bee Gees)
December 23
Adrian Belew, guitarist, singer-songwriter, multi-instrumentalist and record producer
Luther Grosvenor (Spooky Tooth, Mott the Hoople)
date unknown
Jang Sa-ik, singer
Eduardo Gatti, singer-songwriter
Anup Ghoshal, playback singer

Deaths
January 14 – Joaquín Turina, composer, 66
January 19 – Charles Price Jones, hymn-writer, 83
February 1 – Herbert Stothart, conductor and composer, 63
February 1 – George Botsford, composer, 74
February 11 – Giovanni Zenatello, opera tenor, 73
March 7 – Sol Bloom, music industry entrepreneur, 78
March 20 – Irving Fazola, jazz clarinetist, 36 (heart attack)
March 28 – Grigoraş Dinicu, violinist and composer, 59
April 3 – Basil Harwood, organist and composer, 89
May 6 – Maurice Maeterlinck, translator and lyricist, 86
May 10 – Emilio de Gogorza, operatic baritone, 74
May 22 – Hans Pfitzner, German composer (born 1869)
June 2 – Dynam-Victor Fumet, organist and composer, 82
June 4 – Erwin Lendvai, composer and conductor, 66
June 9 – Maria Cebotari, operatic soprano, 39 (cancer)
June 20 – Ramón Montoya, flamenco guitarist, 69
July 7 – Bunk Johnson, jazz trumpeter, exact age unknown
July 9 – Fritz Hart, composer, 75
July 18 – Vítězslav Novák, composer, 78
August 30 – Hans Kindler, cellist, 57
September 5 – Walter Widdop, operatic tenor, 51
September 8 – Richard Strauss, composer, 85
September 11 – Michael Hayvoronsky, violinist, conductor and composer (born 1892)
September 12 – Harry T. Burleigh, composer and singer
September 19 – Nikos Skalkottas, Greek composer, student of Arnold Schoenberg
September 24 – Pierre de Bréville, composer, 88
September 28 – Nancy Dalberg, Danish composer, 68
October 1 – Buddy Clark, American singer, 38 (plane crash)
October 4
Edmund Eysler, Austrian composer, 75
Chris Smith, composer, 69
October 20 – Sam Collins, blues singer and guitarist, 62
October 27 – Ginette Neveu, violin virtuoso, 30 (plane crash)
October 28 – Rosalie Housman, composer, 61
November 25 – Bill "Bojangles" Robinson, American tap dancer, singer and actor
December 6 – Lead Belly, folk and blues musician, 61
December 11 – Fiddlin' John Carson, country musician, 81
December 17 – David Stanley Smith, composer and arranger (born 1877)
December 28 – Ivie Anderson, jazz singer, 44 (asthma)
date unknown
Alice Cucini, operatic contralto (born 1870)
King Solomon Hill (Joe Holmes), blues musician (born 1897)
Lee S. Roberts, composer and pianist (born 1885)
Hooper Brewster-Jones composer and pianist

References

 
20th century in music
Music by year